Cyrus of Edessa (or Qiyore of Edessa) was a Syriac writer and teacher in the Church of the East. He was probably a native of Edessa. He studied at the school of Nisibis (c. 533–538) under Aba, the future patriarch, and then taught at the school of Seleucia-Ctesiphon, eventually rising to become its headmaster. He founded a monastery at Ḥirta sometime after the death of Aba (552).

Cyrus was one of the earliest Syriac authors to write liturgical commentary of the "cause" or explanation (ʿeltā) genre. He wrote six treatises explaining important events of the liturgical year, namely the Great Fast, Maundy Thursday (Pascha), Good Friday (Feast of the Passion), Easter (Feast of the Resurrection), the Feast of the Ascension and the Feast of Pentecost. His work completed that begun by Thomas of Edessa on the feasts of Nativity and Epiphany. Like Thomas, he was influenced by the theology of Theodore of Mopsuestia.

Editions
ed. in W. F. Macomber, Six Explanations of the Liturgical Feasts, Corpus Scriptorum Christianorum Orientalium, vols. 355–356 (1974).

Notes

Bibliography

People from Edessa
6th-century Christian theologians
Church of the East writers
Christian abbots
Syriac Christians
Syriac writers
Christians in the Sasanian Empire